Josef Karl Franz Otto Geitler, Ritter von Armingen (14 September 1870 – 20 June 1923) was an Austrian physicist born in Smíchov, today a district in Prague. He is remembered for his investigations of electromagnetic waves. 

He studied in Prague and Bonn, later obtaining his habilitation at Prague. In 1906 he succeeded Alois Handl (1837-1915) as chair of experimental physics at the University of Czernowitz. In 1919, when Czernowitz became a Romanian university, Geitler relocated to Graz, where he taught classes at the Technische Universität Graz.

Among his scientific research were studies that explained differences between x-rays and cathode rays. His best known publication was Elektromagnetische Schwingungen und Wellen, ("Electromagnetic oscillations and waves") (1905).

He was a cousin to physicist Heinrich Hertz (1857-1894). Among his students at Czernowitz was Wojciech Rubinowicz (1889-1974).

References 
 Scientists and mathematicians in Czernowitz University by Robert Rosner (biographical information)
 Parts of this article are based on a translation of an equivalent article at the German Wikipedia, namely: Österreichisches Biographisches Lexikon 1815-1950, Bd. 1, (Lfg. 5), S. 419

Austrian knights
Austrian physicists
1870 births
1923 deaths
Scientists from Prague
Academic staff of Chernivtsi University